Giovanni Battista Scultori (1503 – 29 December 1575), also Giovanni Battista Mantovano or Mantuana, was an Italian Mannerist painter, sculptor and engraver.

Scultori was born in Mantua. He was a pupil of Giulio Romano, and supported himself through work in the Palazzo del Te. Most of what is known about him is through the 20 or so engravings of his that have survived.  His son Adamo Scultori and daughter Diana Scultori also became engravers. Scultori died in Mantua in 1575.

References

External links
The engravings of Giorgio Ghisi, a full text exhibition catalog from The Metropolitan Museum of Art, which contains material on Giovanni Battista Scultori (see index)

16th-century Italian painters
Italian male painters
16th-century Italian sculptors
Italian male sculptors
Italian engravers
1503 births
1575 deaths